

The Year of the Pitcher
In Major League Baseball, the trend throughout the 1960s was of increased pitching dominance. After the record home run year by Roger Maris in 1961, the major leagues increased the size of the strike zone from the top of the batter's shoulders to the bottom of his knees. A significant "power shortage" culminated in 1968, with far fewer runs scored than in the early 1960s.

Pitchers including Bob Gibson of the St. Louis Cardinals and Denny McLain of the Detroit Tigers dominated hitters, producing 339 shutouts in 1968, almost double the number of shutouts thrown in 1962. Individually, Gibson set a modern earned run average record of 1.12, the lowest in 54 years, and set a World Series record of 17 strikeouts in Game 1. McLain won 31 regular season games, the only player to reach the 30 win milestone since Dizzy Dean in 1934. Mickey Lolich won three complete games in the World Series, the last player as of 2015 to do so. Luis Tiant of the Cleveland Indians had the American League's lowest ERA at 1.60 and allowed a batting average of only .168, a major league record. Don Drysdale of the Los Angeles Dodgers threw a record 58 2/3 consecutive scoreless innings, and Catfish Hunter of the Oakland Athletics was the first American League pitcher to record a perfect game since Don Larsen in Game 5 of the 1956 World Series.

Hitting was anemic as Carl Yastrzemski of the Boston Red Sox would be the only American League hitter to finish the season with a batting average higher than .300. Yastrzemski's batting average of .301 was the lowest batting average of any league batting champion. The American League's collective slugging average of .340 remains the lowest since 1915 (when the game was still in the so-called dead-ball era), while the collective batting average of .231 is the all-time lowest. As a result of the dropping offensive statistics, Major League Baseball Rules Committee took steps to reduce the advantage held by pitchers by lowering the height of the pitchers mound from 15 inches to 10 inches, and by reducing the size of the strike zone for the 1969 season. 1969 batting averages climbed back to their historical averages and never again would pitching have as large a statistical average over batting in the major leagues.

1968 was the final year when baseball had no divisions within the two leagues, with the only post-season competition being the World Series itself. Four expansion teams would join baseball for the season following in 1969. This was also the first season that the Athletics franchise played in Oakland, California, after their departure from Kansas City, Missouri.

Champions

Major League Baseball
World Series: Detroit Tigers over St. Louis Cardinals (4–3); Mickey Lolich, MVP
All-Star Game, July 9 at the Astrodome: National League, 1–0; Willie Mays, MVP

Other champions
Big League World Series: Charleston, West Virginia
College World Series: USC
Japan Series: Yomiuri Giants over Hankyu Braves (4–2)
Little League World Series: Wakayama, Osaka, Japan
Senior League World Series: New Hyde Park, New York

Awards and honors
Baseball Hall of Fame
Kiki Cuyler
Goose Goslin
Joe Medwick
Most Valuable Player
Denny McLain, Detroit Tigers, P (AL)
Bob Gibson, St. Louis Cardinals, P (NL)
Cy Young Award
Denny McLain, Detroit Tigers (AL)
Bob Gibson, St. Louis Cardinals (NL)
Rookie of the Year
Stan Bahnsen, New York Yankees, P (AL)
Johnny Bench, Cincinnati Reds, C (NL)
Gold Glove Award
George Scott (1B) (AL) 
Bobby Knoop (2B) (AL) 
Brooks Robinson (3B) (AL) 
Luis Aparicio (SS) (AL) 
Reggie Smith (OF) (AL) 
Mickey Stanley (OF) (AL) 
Carl Yastrzemski (OF) (AL)
Bill Freehan (C) (AL) 
Jim Kaat (P) (AL)

MLB statistical leaders

Major league baseball final standings

American League final standings

National League final standings

Events

January
January 23 – Joe Medwick is voted into the Hall of Fame by the Baseball Writers' Association of America.
January 28 – Goose Goslin and Kiki Cuyler are admitted into the Hall of Fame by unanimous vote of the Special Veterans Committee.

February
February 6 – Voters in King County, Washington, approve by 62 percent a $40 million bond issue to build a domed, multipurpose stadium. The Kingdome, being built between 1972 and 1976, would operate from 1976 until its demolition in 2000.
February 13 –  The San Francisco Giants and Los Angeles Dodgers execute a four-player trade, with Tom Haller one of the two players going to Los Angeles and Ron Hunt one of the two going to San Francisco. The trade is the first between the two clubs since their move to the West Coast, and also the first since the one that would have sent Jackie Robinson from the Brooklyn Dodgers to the New York Giants after the 1956 season, but he retired rather than report with his new team.

March

April
April 9 – Opening Day is postponed because of the funeral of Martin Luther King Jr., who was assassinated on April 4.
April 14 – Jim Bunning's first win with the Pittsburgh Pirates, 3–0 at Los Angeles' Dodger Stadium, is his 40th career shutout and includes his 1,000th National League strikeout, making him the first pitcher since Cy Young with 1,000 in each league.
April 15 – At the Astrodome, the Houston Astros defeat the New York Mets 1–0 in a 24-inning, 6-hour, 6-minute marathon. In the bottom of the 24th, Bob Aspromonte's bases-loaded ground ball goes through the legs of Met shortstop Al Weis for an error (the only one committed by the Mets all game) that plates Norm Miller for the winning run. To date, the game is the longest to end in a shutout in terms of both innings and duration.
April 19 – Nolan Ryan of the New York Mets becomes the sixth pitcher in National League history to strike out the side on nine pitches. But Los Angeles wins 3–2 at New York's Shea Stadium.
April 27 – Tom Phoebus, the Baltimore Orioles' top pitcher in 1967, throws a 6–0 no-hitter against the Boston Red Sox at Baltimore's Memorial Stadium. Brooks Robinson drives in three runs and makes a great stab to rob Rico Petrocelli of a hit in the 8th inning. Converted outfielder Curt Blefary catches the game.

May
May 2 - At Shea Stadium, pitcher John Boozer of the Philadelphia Phillies is ejected from a game without having thrown a pitch. His Phillies trailing the New York Mets by what will be the final score of 3-0, Boozer, after a 13-minute rain delay, enters the game in the seventh inning in relief of Woodie Fryman and repeatedly goes to his mouth while warming up in contravention of the anti-spitball rule that had been introduced this year. Home plate umpire Ed Vargo gives Boozer two warnings and awards three balls to batter Bud Harrelson—the last resulting in Boozer's ejection, as well as that of Phillie manager Gene Mauch.
May 6 –  At Memorial Stadium, Baltimore Orioles pitcher Dave Leonhard took a no-hitter into the seventh inning before Detroit Tigers outfielder Jim Northrup broke it up with a single after two outs. He had to conform with a one-hit shutout, 4–0 victory over Detroit.
May 8 – At Oakland–Alameda County Coliseum, Catfish Hunter of the Oakland Athletics pitches a 4-0 perfect game over the Minnesota Twins. The perfect game is the first in an American League regular season game since Charlie Robertson's in 1922 and the first no-hitter in the franchise's Oakland history, which is in only its 25th game. (The franchise had never had a no-hitter in its Kansas City history, which was from 1955 to 1967. Its last no-hitter was by Bill McCahan on September 3, 1947; the franchise was then based in Philadelphia.) Hunter strikes out 11 batters, including Rich Reese for the final out. He also records three RBIs: with a seventh-inning bunt single that drives in Rick Monday to break a scoreless tie, and a single in the eighth to drive in Jim Pagliaroni, his catcher, and Monday.

June
June 1 – St. Louis Cardinals pitcher Joe Hoerner ties a National League record for relievers with 6 consecutive strikeouts vs. the New York Mets.
June 3 – The New York Yankees turn a triple play in the eighth inning of a 4–3 loss to the Minnesota Twins. It would be the team's last triple play until .
June 8 – Against the Philadelphia Phillies at Dodger Stadium, Don Drysdale of the Los Angeles Dodgers breaks Walter Johnson's 1913 streak of 56 consecutive scoreless innings. A fifth-inning sacrifice fly by Howie Bedell scores Tony Taylor for the run that ends the streak at 58 consecutive scoreless innings. This new record will stand until another Dodger, Orel Hershiser, breaks it in 1988 with 59 consecutive scoreless innings.
June 24 – Detroit Tigers right fielder Jim Northrup belted two grand slams, as the Tigers beat the Cleveland Indians, 14–3, at Cleveland Stadium. Northrup connected his first grand slam off  Eddie Fisher in the 5th inning and the second off Billy Rohr in the 6th, to become the sixth player in Major League Baseball history to hit two grand slams in one single game.
June 28 - The Cubs took the Dodgers, 8-3 and 1-0 in front of 42,261 the largest Wrigley Field crowd in over 20 years. Randy Hundley caught both games of a doubleheader and drove in four of the Cubs nine runs.

July
July 1 – As a part of the season that will see him post a 1.12 ERA, Bob Gibson's streak of 47 and two-thirds inning of scoreless pitching is broken.
July 3 – Luis Tiant of the Cleveland Indians strikes out 19 in a ten inning, 1–0 victory over the Minnesota Twins.
July 9 – At the Houston Astrodome, in the first All-Star Game to be played in an indoor arena and on artificial turf, the National League defeats the American League 1–0. Appropriately, pitching dominates the game. Willie Mays, playing in place of injured Pete Rose, tallies an unearned run in the first inning against American League starter Luis Tiant. Don Drysdale, Juan Marichal, Steve Carlton, Tom Seaver, Ron Reed and Jerry Koosman hold the AL to three hits, as Mays is named MVP.
July 11 – The Baltimore Orioles promote first base coach Earl Weaver to manager, replacing Hank Bauer.
July 14:
Hank Aaron becomes the 8th player in major league history to reach 500 career homers.
Don Wilson of the Houston Astros strikes out 18, including eight in a row at one point.
July 24 – Hoyt Wilhelm appears in his 907th game as a pitcher, breaking Cy Young's long standing all-time record.
July 30 – Washington Senators' shortstop Ron Hansen, playing in Cleveland, completes the eighth unassisted triple play in history, and the first since 1927.  Cleveland wins, 10–1.

August

September
September 14 – Denny McLain becomes the first 30-game winner since Dizzy Dean in 1934 as the Detroit Tigers beat the Oakland Athletics, 5–4, at Detroit's Tiger Stadium. Reggie Jackson's home run in the 4th puts the A's ahead 2–0, but Norm Cash answers with a three-run shot. Jackson hits another in the 6th, but the Tigers push across two in the 9th to win. Al Kaline, pinch hitting for McLain, walks and scores the tying run. McLain, who posted a 31–6 record in the regular season, gives up six hits and strikes out 10.
September 15 – The St. Louis Cardinals clinch the National League pennant with a 7–4 win at the Astrodome over the host Houston Astros. Roger Maris hits his 275th, and last, regular-season home run off Don Wilson in the 3rd inning, and Curt Flood racks up five hits.
September 17 – Gaylord Perry of the San Francisco Giants hurls a no-hitter at Candlestick Park as the Giants edge the visiting St. Louis Cardinals and Bob Gibson, 1–0. Ron Hunt's first-inning home run (the second of the only two he will hit on the season and one of only 11 Gibson will allow in 304 innings) backs Perry, who evens his record at 14–14.
September 18 – Sixteen hours after Perry's feat, Ray Washburn of the St. Louis Cardinals makes major league history by hurling a second consecutive no-hitter in the same park. Run-scoring hits by Mike Shannon and Curt Flood at Candlestick down the Giants, 2–0.  This is the first time in history back-to-back no hitters have been pitched between the same two teams on two consecutive days.
September 22 – Minnesota Twins utility player César Tovar plays all nine positions, an inning each, against the Oakland Athletics.  Duplicating the feat that Bert Campaneris performed three years earlier, Tovar tops Campy by starting as pitcher and allows no hits or runs, for a 0.00 earned run average.  In the inning, the first man to face Tovar was Campaneris, who fouls out.  Tovar then strikes out slugger Reggie Jackson.  Tovar is charged with a walk and a balk in the scoreless inning; his other contributions to the 2-1 Minnesota win include a single, a walk, a stolen base and a run scored.  He makes five putouts and an assist, with no fielding errors.  
September 28 – Mickey Mantle plays in his 2,401st and final game, eight days after hitting his last home run ending his career with 536.
September 29: 
Carl Yastrzemski of the Boston Red Sox goes 0-for-5 but maintains a .3005 batting average, to win his second straight American League batting crown with the lowest winning average. Yastrzemski is the league's only .300 hitter. Danny Cater of the Oakland Athletics ends second with a .290 average.
At Shea Stadium, Dick Allen hits three home runs in the Philadelphia Phillies' 10-3 victory over the New York Mets. Evan Longoria will join them by hitting three home runs in the Tampa Bay Rays'  regular-season finale.

October
October 2 – For the first time in history, two soon-to-be-named MVPs oppose each other in Game One of the 1968 World Series. St. Louis Cardinals' Bob Gibson is nearly untouchable with a Series-record 17 strikeouts and a 4–0 win over Denny McLain and the Detroit Tigers. Detroit manager Mayo Smith moves Gold Glove outfielder Mickey Stanley to shortstop, improving his offense by opening a spot for Al Kaline. 
October 10 – In Game Seven of the World Series, Mickey Lolich of the Detroit Tigers, pitching on two days rest, wins his third game of the Series as he beats Bob Gibson and the St. Louis Cardinals, 4–1. Lolich brings Detroit its first World Championship since 1945. Lolich hurls a five-hitter, and is named Series MVP. Key moments came in the 6th inning when Lolich picks Lou Brock and Curt Flood off first base to keep the score 0–0. With the game scoreless in the 7th, the Tigers have two on and two out when Jim Northrup hits a line drive to center field. Gold-glover Flood misjudges the ball and starts in, allowing the ball to sail over his head for a triple. Northrup then scores on Bill Freehan's double for a 3–0 lead. Each team adds a 9th inning run to account for the 4–1 final score. It is the first time the Cardinals have lost a 7th game of a World Series. The Tigers become only the 3rd team to rally from a 3–1 deficit to win the Series 4 games to 3 (the 1925 Pirates and 1958 Yankees are the first two). The Tigers become the last team to win the championship between two first-place teams from leagues without division play where the pennant is automatically awarded to the team with the best won-lost record in its league.
October 21 – After two seasons with the Boston Red Sox, All-Star catcher Elston Howard announces his retirement.

November
November 1 - Denny McLain, the last pitcher to win 30 games in a season, is the unanimous American League winner of the Cy Young Award.
November 19 – New York Yankees pitcher Stan Bahnsen, who posted a 17–12 record with 162 strikeouts and a 2.05 ERA, is named American League Rookie of the Year. Bahnsen easily outdistances outfielder Del Unser of the Washington Senators.
November 22 – Cincinnati Reds catcher Johnny Bench edges out New York Mets pitcher Jerry Koosman to win the National League Rookie of the Year Award. Bench becomes the third member of the Reds in six years to be named the top rookie.

December

Births

January
January 8 – Paul Carey
January 8 – Brian Johnson
January 9 – Tom Kramer
January 11 – Ben Rivera
January 20 – Ramón Mañón
January 21 – Keith Shepherd
January 21 – Tom Urbani
January 23 – Victor Cole
January 24 – Ross Powell
January 27 – Rusty Meacham
January 27 – Eric Wedge
January 29 – Kevin Roberson
January 31 – Steve Phoenix

February
February 1 – Kent Mercker
February 2 – Scott Erickson
February 5 – Roberto Alomar
February 5 – Andrés Santana
February 9 – Robert Eenhoorn
February 9 – Brad Holman
February 10 – Ryan Bowen
February 10 – Eddie Zosky
February 11 – Dave Swartzbaugh
February 13 – Matt Mieske
February 14 – Scott Scudder
February 15 – Luis Mercedes
February 18 – Kyle Abbott
February 22 – Kazuhiro Sasaki
February 25 – David Hulse
February 26 – J. T. Snow
February 27 – Matt Stairs
February 28 – Mike Milchin

March
March 3 – Bobby Muñoz
March 3 – Scott Radinsky
March 4 – Giovanni Carrara
March 4 – Brian Hunter
March 7 – Denis Boucher
March 7 – Jeff Kent
March 8 – Jim Dougherty
March 11 – Gar Finnvold
March 15 – Kim Batiste
March 17 – Pat Gomez
March 17 – Dan Masteller
March 19 – Pete Young
March 22 – Ramón Martínez
March 26 – Gerald Alexander
March 26 – Shane Reynolds
March 26 – José Vizcaíno
March 27 – Tom Quinlan
March 29 – Juan Bell

April
April 1 – Masumi Kuwata
April 2 – Curt Leskanic
April 3 – Tomoaki Kanemoto
April 3 – Mike Lansing
April 4 – Jim Dedrick
April 12 – Cliff Brantley
April 12 – Dave Staton
April 14 – Jesse Levis
April 15 – Billy Brewer
April 19 – Brent Mayne
April 22 – Mike Bell
April 23 – Guillermo Velasquez
April 24 – Todd Jones
April 27 – Patrick Lennon

May
May 2 – Paul Emmel
May 3 – Iván Cruz
May 4 – Eddie Pérez
May 6 – Phil Clark
May 9 – Glenn Sutko
May 11 – Mike Garcia
May 12 – Mark Clark
May 13 – Braulio Castillo
May 14 – Mark Dalesandro
May 18 – Clemente Álvarez
May 19 – Alan Zinter
May 21 – Greg O'Halloran
May 21 – Steve Pegues
May 22 – Al Levine
May 24 – Jerry Dipoto
May 25 – Will Pennyfeather
May 27 – Jeff Bagwell
May 27 – Frank Thomas
May 30 – Mike Oquist

June
June 8 – Dave Mlicki
June 12 – Scott Aldred
June 30 – Dan Peltier

July
July 3 – Mike Farmer
July 7 – Mike Busch
July 7 – Chuck Knoblauch
July 8 – Garland Kiser
July 14 – Derrick May
July 18 – Rolando Arrojo
July 23 – Bubba Carpenter
July 24 – Rob Lukachyk
July 26 – Mike Mohler
July 27 – Tom Goodwin

August
August 1 – Brian Bohanon
August 1 – Shigetoshi Hasegawa
August 2 – Frank Cimorelli
August 3 – Rod Beck
August 3 – Kevin Morton
August 4 – Chris Hook
August 5 – John Olerud
August 6 – Darryl Scott
August 9 – Mike Shildt
August 12 – Reggie Harris
August 12 – Tony Longmire
August 20 – Kevin Rogers
August 21 – Mike Misuraca
August 21 – Tuffy Rhodes
August 22 – Gary Scott
August 24 – Tim Salmon
August 26 – Brian Bark
August 31 – Pat Howell
August 31 – Hideo Nomo

September
September 4 – Mike Piazza
September 6 – Pat Meares
September 7 – Julio Peguero
September 12 – Masao Kida
September 13 – Erik Bennett
September 13 – Denny Neagle
September 13 – Bernie Williams
September 14 – Doug Eddings
September 15 – Rich Robertson
September 16 – Mark Acre
September 19 – Pedro Muñoz
September 20 – Donnie Elliott
September 23 – Rodney Bolton
September 25 – Reggie Jefferson
September 26 – Brian Shouse
September 28 – Keiichi Yabu
September 29 – Derek Parks

October
October 1 – Jeff Patterson
October 2 – Greg Gibson
October 3 – Jim Byrd
October 5 – Alex Diaz
October 5 – Ron Kulpa
October 6 – Ed Pierce
October 7 – Milt Cuyler
October 7 – Butch Henry
October 13 – Julio Valera
October 14 – Zak Shinall
October 15 – Matt Dunbar
October 20 – Rudy Seánez
October 22 – Keith Osik
October 24 – Ken Ryan
October 26 – Scott Lydy
October 30 – Greg McCarthy
October 30 – Erik Plantenberg
October 31 – Eddie Taubensee

November
November 3 – Paul Quantrill
November 4 – Carlos Baerga
November 4 – Domingo Cedeño
November 4 – Osvaldo Fernández
November 6 – Chad Curtis
November 7 – Russ Springer
November 8 – José Offerman
November 9 – Andy Carter
November 12 – Randy Knorr
November 12 – Sammy Sosa
November 13 – Pat Hentgen
November 13 – Mark Kiefer
November 14 – Kent Bottenfield
November 16 – Chris Haney
November 18 – Clay Bellinger
November 18 – Gary Sheffield
November 18 – Phil Stidham
November 18 – Darrell Whitmore
November 19 – Luis Raven
November 20 – Chuck Ricci
November 20 – Steve Schrenk
November 24 – Dave Hansen
November 24 – Steve Mintz
November 25 – John Johnstone
November 25 – Shingo Takatsu
November 26 – Héctor Wagner
November 28 – Pedro Astacio
November 28 – Terry Burrows
November 28 – Scott Sheldon
November 29 – Allen Battle
November 29 – Pedro Martínez
November 30 – Heath Haynes

December
December 2 – Darryl Kile
December 8 – Mike Mussina
December 11 – Derek Bell
December 17 – Curtis Pride
December 22 – David Nied
December 22 – Jim Reynolds
December 23 – Rick White
December 24 – Kirt Ojala
December 25 – Scott Bullett
December 27 – Dean Palmer
December 29 – James Mouton

Deaths

January
January 2 – Tommy Warren, 50, left-handed pitcher and pinch hitter who appeared in 41 total games (22 on the mound) for the wartime 1944 Brooklyn Dodgers.
January 3 – Rich Gee, 73, catcher in the Negro leagues between 1923 and 1929, mainly as a member of the New York Lincoln Giants of the Eastern Colored League.
January 9 – Ed Strelecki, 62, pitcher in 42 games for the 1928–1929 St. Louis Browns and 1931 Cincinnati Reds.
January 11 – George Hunter, 80, outfielder and left-handed pitcher who appeared in 45 games for the 1909 Brooklyn Superbas.
January 13 – Ernie Herbert, 80, pitcher in six games for the 1913 Cincinnati Reds and 29 games for the 1914–1915 St. Louis Terriers of the Federal League, then considered an "outlaw" circuit but now classified as a major league.
January 13 – Marty Lang, 62, left-handed pitcher who had a two-game "cup of coffee" with 1930 Pittsburgh Pirates.
January 14 – Bill Black, 68, pinch hitter and second baseman in five games for the 1924 Chicago White Sox.
January 16 – Elias "Liz" Funk, 63, outfielder and pinch hitter in 123 career games for the 1929 New York Yankees, 1930 Detroit Tigers and 1932–1933 Chicago White Sox.
January 23 – Patsy Flaherty, 91, left-handed spitball pitcher between 1899 and 1913 with Louisville, Pittsburgh, Boston and Philadelphia of the National League (NL) and Chicago of the American League (AL); led AL in games lost (25) in 1903, then posted a 19–9 mark for the NL Pirates the following season.
January 26 – John Kobs, 69, head baseball coach of Michigan State University from 1925 through 1963; his Spartans teams won 576 games during his tenure.
January 26 – Eddie Phillips, 66, catcher in 312 games for the Boston Braves, Detroit Tigers, Pittsburgh Pirates, New York Yankees, Washington Senators and Cleveland Indians between 1924 and 1935; member of 1932 World Series champion Yankees.

February
February 3 – Jake Pitler, 73, Brooklyn Dodger coach (1947 to 1957) who in 11 seasons was part of six National League pennant-winners and 1955 World Series champions; former minor league manager; in his playing days, second baseman who appeared in 111 games for the 1917–1918 Pirates.
February 6 – Leroy Matlock, 60, southpaw hurler and three-time All-Star who twice led the Negro National League in winning percentage (1931, 1935) and once in games won (1936), playing primarily for the Pittsburgh Crawfords and St. Louis Stars; also appeared as an outfielder and first baseman.
February 7 – Ollie Marquardt, 65, second baseman in 17 games for the 1931 Boston Red Sox; later a successful minor league manager.
February 9 – Lou Bruce, 91, Native American of the Mohawk people who appeared in 30 games for the 1904 Philadelphia Athletics.
February 11 – Dorothea Downs, 50, All-American Girls Professional Baseball League player.
February 12 – Johnny Siegle, 93, outfielder for the Cincinnati Reds who played 39 games in 1905 and 1906.
February 14 – Bill Lelivelt, 83, Dutch-born pitcher who appeared in five total games for the Detroit Tigers of 1909 and 1910.
February 18 – Ben Egan, 84, backup catcher for Philadelphia (1908 and 1912) and Cleveland (1914–1915) of the American League who played in 122 career games.
February 23 – Hank Schreiber, 76, infielder who played a total of 36 games over five abbreviated trials with five teams: the 1914 White Sox, 1917 Braves, 1919 Reds, 1921 Giants and 1926 Cubs.
February 28 – Lena Blackburne, 81, weak-hitting infielder who played 228 games with five MLB clubs between 1910 and 1928; manager of the Chicago White Sox from July 6, 1928 through 1929; coach for 17 years with three teams, notably the Philadelphia Athletics; scout and minor league manager; originated the practice of rubbing special Delaware River mud on new baseballs to remove their slippery finish; in 1938, he formed a company that as of 2020 still supplied the major and minor leagues with this product.

March
March 4 – Duke Reilley, 83, outfielder for the 1909 Cleveland Naps who played in 20 games.
March 7 – LeRoy Taylor, 65, outfielder who played in the Negro leagues and for barnstorming black teams from 1925 to 1936 for six clubs, most prominently the Kansas City Monarchs.
March 18 – Heinie Meine, 71, nicknamed "The Count of Luxemburg", pitcher who played all but one of his 165 MLB games for the 1929–1934 Pittsburgh Pirates; tied for the National League lead in games won (19) in 1931.
March 20 – Clyde "Hardrock" Shoun, 56, left-handed hurler in 454 games for the Chicago Cubs, St. Louis Cardinals, Cincinnati Reds, Boston Braves and Chicago White Sox between 1935–1944 and 1946–1949; on May 15, 1944, as a Red, he authored a no-hit, no-run game against the Braves.
March 24 – Ovid Nicholson, 79, outfielder who went 5-for-11 (.455) in his six-game cup of coffee with the 1912 Pittsburgh Pirates.
March 29 – Buddy Napier, 78, pitcher in 39 total games for the 1912 St. Louis Browns, 1918 Chicago Cubs and 1920–1921 Cincinnati Reds.
March 30 – Bernie Hungling, 72, catcher for the Brooklyn Robins (1922–1923) and St. Louis Browns (1930) who appeared in 51 games.
March 31 – Grover Lowdermilk, 83, pitcher who appeared in 122 games for six clubs between 1908 and 1920, chiefly the St. Louis Browns and Chicago White Sox.

April
April 12 – Frank Sigafoos, 64, infielder who played 55 career games for the 1926 Philadelphia Athletics, 1929 Detroit Tigers, 1929 Chicago White Sox and 1931 Cincinnati Reds.
April 14 – Al Benton, 57, pitcher who won 98 games for four American League teams over 14 seasons between 1934 and 1952, principally for the Tigers; only pitcher to face Babe Ruth (1934) and Mickey Mantle (1952).
April 17 – Bill Engeln, 69, National League umpire from 1952 to 1956.
April 19 – Tommy Bridges, 61, six-time All-Star pitcher who won 194 games for the Detroit Tigers (1930–1943 and 1945–1946), including three 20-win seasons; posted a 4–1 World Series record and won rings in 1935 and 1945.
April 22 – Melvin Coleman, 57, shortstop/catcher for the 1937 Birmingham Black Barons and 1944 Atlanta Black Crackers.
April 29 – Terris McDuffie, 59, Negro league pitcher in a long career that spanned from 1930 through 1954, playing for several teams in different leagues across the United States, Canada and Latin America.

May
May 3 – Ray Gardner, 66, shortstop who played 115 games for the Cleveland Indians in 1931–1932.
May 15 – Bill Drescher, 46, catcher who appeared in 46 games for the New York Yankees from 1944 to 1946.
May 16 – Bill Brandt, 53, pitcher who worked in 34 career games for the 1941–1943 Pittsburgh Pirates.
May 23 – Hubert Lockhart, 69, southpaw who pitched for the 1923–1928 Atlantic City Bacharach Giants of the Eastern Colored League and 1929 Chicago American Giants of the Negro National League; led ECL in winning percentage (.778) in 1923.
May 26 – Chippy Gaw, 76, pitcher in six games for the 1920 Chicago Cubs.
May 26 – Doc Ayers, 77, spitball pitcher who worked in 299 games for the Washington Senators and Detroit Tigers between 1913 and 1921.
May 27 – Herman Bronkie, 83, third baseman and second baseman who played in only 122 games over seven seasons spread over 13 years for four teams, most notably for the 1919 and 1922 St. Louis Browns.
May 27 – Rip Collins, 72, four-sport star at Texas A&M University and pitcher in the American League from 1920 to 1931; won 108 career games for the New York Yankees, Boston Red Sox, Detroit Tigers and St. Louis Browns; member of the 1921 AL champion Yankees.
May 27 – Charlie Jackson, 74, outfielder in one game for 1915 Chicago White Sox and 41 contests for 1917 Pittsburgh Pirates.

June
June 10 – Curly Brown, 79, left-handed pitcher who made 28 total appearances for the 1911–1913 St. Louis Browns and 1915 Cincinnati Reds.
June 11 – Dan Boone, 73, pitcher for the Philadelphia Athletics, Detroit Tigers and Cleveland Indians who appeared in 42 games from 1920 through 1923.
June 11 – Bill Regan, 69, second baseman for the Boston Red Sox (1926–1930) and Pittsburgh Pirates (1931), who became the first player in Red Sox history to hit two home runs in the same inning (1928), a mark only matched by one man, Ellis Burks, 62 years later.
June 15 – Sam Crawford, 88, Hall of Fame right fielder for the Cincinnati Reds (1899–1902) and Detroit Tigers (1903–1917), a lifetime .309 hitter who hit a record 312 triples, led both leagues in home runs, and retired with the fifth-most RBI in history and 2,961 career hits.
June 25 – Grant Bowler, 60, pitcher who worked in 17 contests for the Chicago White Sox in 1931 and 1932.
June 25 – Dan Dugan, 61, left-handed pitcher who worked in 20 games for the White Sox in 1928 and 1929.
June 29 – Paddy Driscoll, 73, second baseman who batted only .107 in 13 games for the 1917 Chicago Cubs, but became well-known as a player and coach in the National Football League for over forty years.

July
July 1 – Dave Barbee, 63, outfielder who appeared in 116 career games for the 1926 Philadelphia Athletics and 1932 Pittsburgh Pirates.
July 3 – Pat Simmons, 59, pitcher who played from 1928 to 1929 for the Boston Red Sox.
July 4 – John Quinn, 70, American League umpire from 1935 to 1942.
July 8 – Dusty Boggess, 64, National League umpire for 18 seasons (1944–1948 and 1950–1962) who worked in four World Series.
July 9 – Hap Collard, 69, pitcher in 35 career games for the 1927–1928 Cleveland Indians and 1930 Philadelphia Phillies.
July 12 – Kettle Wirts, 70, catcher who appeared 49 games over four seasons (1921 to 1924) for the Chicago Cubs and the crosstown White Sox.
July 15 – Eddie Kearse, 52, catcher who played in 11 games for 1942 New York Yankees.
July 17 – Ken Sears, 51, catcher who appeared in 60 games for 1943 Yankees and seven more for 1946 St. Louis Browns; son of NL umpire Ziggy Sears.
July 27 – Babe Adams, 86, pitcher who won 194 games for the Pittsburgh Pirates; the only member of their championship teams in both 1909 and 1925, he won three games in the 1909 World Series.
July 27 – Jack Redmond, 57, catcher with 1936 Washington Senators who played in 22 games.
July 27 – Howie Storie, 57, backup catcher who appeared in a dozen games with the Boston Red Sox in 1931 and 1932.
July 27 – Dave Thomas, 63, brilliant defensive first baseman who played in the Negro leagues between 1929 and 1946, most prominently for the New York Cubans and Birmingham Black Barons.
July 29 – Bill Hart, 55, third baseman and shortstop who appeared in 95 games for the Brooklyn Dodgers during the wartime seasons of 1943 to 1945.

August
August 3 – John Jenkins, 72, infielder and pinch hitter in five contests for 1922 Chicago White Sox.
August 10 – Charlie Boardman, 75, pitcher in a total of seven games over three seasons (1913 to 1915) for the Philadelphia Athletics and St. Louis Browns.
August 13 – Lefty Guise, 59, knuckleball-throwing pitcher who appeared in two September games for pennant-bound 1940 Cincinnati Reds.
August 17 – Forrest More, 86, pitcher who went 2–10 (4.74 ERA) in 25 games for St. Louis and Boston of the National League in 1909.
August 22 – Heinie Groh, 78, third baseman who played in 1,676 games for the New York Giants, Cincinnati Reds and Pittsburgh Pirates between 1912 and 1927; led the National League in hits, runs and walks once each and in doubles twice, widely known for his "bottle bat".
August 23 – Dutch Henry, 66, left-handed pitcher who appeared in 164 career games between 1921 and 1930 for the St. Louis Browns, Brooklyn Robins, New York Giants and Chicago White Sox.
August 24 – Dolly Stark, 70, NL umpire for 12 seasons (1928–1935 and 1937–1940) who worked in two World Series, and later became a broadcaster.
August 26 – John Kroner, 59, infielder who played 223 total games for the 1935–1936 Boston Red Sox and 1937–1938 Cleveland Indians
August 29 – Paul Howard, 84, outfielder who played in six games for the 1909 Boston Red Sox.
August 31 – Jay Kirke, 80, legendary minor-league hitter who batted .301 in 320 major-league games with the Detroit Tigers (1910), Boston Rustlers and Braves (1911–1913), Cleveland Naps and Indians (1914–1915), and New York Giants (1918).

September
September 2 – Nish Williams, 64, catcher/outfielder who had a ten-year career (1930–1939) in the Negro leagues; stepfather of Donn Clendenon.
September 3 – Tony DeFate, 68, infielder for both the St. Louis Cardinals (14 games) and Detroit Tigers (three games) in 1917.
September 4 – Ernie Orsatti, 65, outfielder in 701 career games, all with the Cardinals (1927–1935); batted .306 lifetime; regular center fielder for the 1934 "Gashouse Gang"; appeared in four World Series (1928, 1930, 1931 and 1934), winning rings in 1931 and 1934.
September 12 – Don Rudolph, 37, left-handed pitcher who appeared in 124 games for the Chicago White Sox (1957–1959), Cincinnati Reds (1959), Cleveland Indians (1962) and Washington Senators (1962–1964).
September 14 – Hans Lobert, 86, third baseman for five National League clubs from 1903 to 1917; later a coach (1934–1941 and 1943–1944), manager (of the 1942 Philadelphia Phillies), and scout (1945–1967).
September 18 – Bill Kalfass, 52, left-handed hurler who made three appearances for 1937 Philadelphia Athletics.
September 18 – Rip Wheeler, 70, pitched in 34 games for the Pittsburgh Pirates and Chicago Cubs from 1921 to 1924.
September 25 – Ken Holloway, 71, pitcher who worked in 285 games for the Detroit Tigers, Cleveland Indians and New York Yankees between 1922 and 1930.
September 26 – Bud Clancy, 68, first baseman who played in 522 contests over nine seasons between 1924 and 1934 for the Chicago White Sox, Brooklyn Dodgers and Philadelphia Phillies.

October
October 5 – Hal Bevan, 37, third baseman and pinch hitter in 15 career games for the Boston Red Sox (1952), Philadelphia (1952) and Kansas City Athletics (1955), and Cincinnati Reds (1961); despite his brief tenure with 1961 Reds, featured in relief pitcher Jim Brosnan's classic memoir, Pennant Race.
October 14 – Lynn Brenton, 79, pitcher who appeared in 34 total games for both of Ohio's MLB teams: Cleveland (1913, 1915) and Cincinnati (1920–1921).
October 16 – Ellis Kinder, 54, pitcher who fashioned a 102–71 record in 484 appearances for the St. Louis Browns (1946–1947), Boston Red Sox (1948–1955), St. Louis Cardinals (1956) and Chicago White Sox (1956–1957); excelled as both a starter (won 23 games in 1949) and reliever (led American League in saves in 1951 and 1953).
October 20 – Turner Barber, 75, outfielder who played in 491 games for the Washington Senators, Chicago Cubs and Brooklyn Robins between 1915 and 1923.
October 21 – Jack Killilay, 81, pitcher in 14 games for the 1911 Boston Red Sox.
October 23 – Jack Bliss, 86, catcher for St. Louis Cardinals who appeared in 251 games between 1908 and 1912.
October 23 – Mike Kelly, 72, minor-league catcher, first baseman and manager who spent seven years as a major-league coach for the Chicago White Sox (1930–1931), Chicago Cubs (1934), Boston Bees (1938–1939) and Pittsburgh Pirates (1940–1941).
October 28 – Bullet Campbell, 72, pitcher for the Hilldale Club of the Eastern Colored League (1924–1927) and New York Lincoln Giants of the ECL (1928) and American Negro League (1929).
October 31 – Ralph Glaze, 87, pitcher in 61 games for the Boston Americans between 1906 and 1908; later a head football coach at several prominent U.S. colleges.
October 31 – Hub Perdue, 86, pitcher who appeared in 161 career games between 1911 and 1915 for Boston and St. Louis of the National League.

November
November 3 – Vern Stephens, 48, eight-time All-Star shortstop for the St. Louis Browns (1941–1947 and 1953), Boston Red Sox (1948–1952), Chicago White Sox (1953 and 1955) and Baltimore Orioles (1954–1955) who led or co-led the American League in RBI three times (1944, 1949 and 1950) and led the AL in home runs once (1945).
November 5 – Wally Mattick, 81, center fielder in 169 career games for the Chicago White Sox from 1912 to 1913, and briefly with the St. Louis Cardinals in 1918; father of Bobby Mattick.
November 6 – Earl Gurley, outfielder, first baseman and southpaw pitcher for seven clubs in the Negro leagues, chiefly the Memphis Red Sox, between 1922 and 1932.
November 14 – "Wee Willie" Sherdel, 72, left-handed pitcher who won 165 games (losing 146) for the St. Louis Cardinals (1918–1930 and 1932) and Boston Braves (1931–1932); member of 1926 world champions.
November 17 – Earl Hamilton, 77, pitcher who appeared in 410 games in MLB between 1911 and 1924, mostly with the St. Louis Browns and Pittsburgh Pirates; later a minor league team owner.
November 20 – George Maisel, 76, outfielder for the 1913 St. Louis Browns, 1916 Detroit Tigers and 1921–1922 Chicago Cubs; brother of Fritz Maisel.
November 20 – Fresco Thompson, 66, second baseman and front-office executive; played 669 games between 1925 and 1934 for Pittsburgh, New York, Philadelphia and Brooklyn of the National League, then became a minor league manager; in 1946, began a 23-year executive career with the Brooklyn/Los Angeles Dodgers as assistant farm system director until his promotion to vice president and farm director in 1950; after almost 18 years in that job, he served as Dodgers' executive vp and general manager from June 4, 1968 until his death.
November 24 – Dearie Mulvey, 70, co-owner of the Dodgers from 1938 to 1950 and, with her husband, retained a 25 percent share in the team from 1950 until her death; daughter of Stephen McKeever.
November 27 – Ed Fernandes, 50, catcher who appeared in 42 MLB games for 1940 Pittsburgh Pirates and 1946 Chicago White Sox.

December
December 4 – Emil Yde, 68, pitcher in 141 games for the Pittsburgh Pirates (1924–1927) and Detroit Tigers (1929); led National League in winning percentage (16–3, .842) and shutouts (four) as a rookie in 1924; member of 1925 World Series champions.
December 8 – Benn Karr, 75, pitcher for the Boston Red Sox (1920–1922) and Cleveland Indians (1925–1927) who appeared in 177 career games.
December 12 – Ty Tyson, 80, broadcaster and legendary early play-by-play voice of the Detroit Tigers, calling games on radio (1927–1942 and 1951–1953) and television (1947–1950).
December 15 – Jim McLaughlin, 66, third baseman who went hitless in his lone MLB at bat for the St. Louis Browns on April 18, 1932.
December 17 – Hank Severeid, 77, catcher for the  Cincinnati Reds, St. Louis Browns, Washington Senators and New York Yankees between 1911 and 1926, hitting .289 in 1,390 games.
December 22 – Benny Bengough, 70, catcher who played 411 games for the New York Yankees (1923–1930) and St. Louis Browns (1931–1932) and member of three World Series champions (1923, 1927 and 1928); later spent 20 years as a coach in the majors, 14 of them for the Philadelphia Phillies.
December 22 – Ike Powers, 62, pitcher who appeared in 20 games for the 1927–1928 Philadelphia Athletics.
December 24 – Johnnie Heving, 72, catcher for the St. Louis Browns, Boston Red Sox and Philadelphia Athletics between 1920 and 1932 who appeared in 399 career contests.
December 25 – Roosevelt Tate, 57, outfielder who played in the Negro Southern League (1932) and Negro American League (1937) in 41 games for five teams.
December 28 – Roosevelt Davis, 64, pitcher for over a dozen teams in four different Negro leagues between 1924 and 1945; led Negro National League in games won (16) in 1925 and winning percentage (8–0, 1.000) in 1928, and the Negro American League in earned run average (1.65) in 1945.
December 30 – Dick Marlowe, 39, pitcher who worked in 98 games between 1951 and 1956, all but one of them as a member of the Detroit Tigers.

References